Margus Lepa (born 7 October 1953) is an Estonian radio journalist and former actor.

Early life and education
He was born in Pelgulinn, a subdistrict of Tallinn, Estonia to baritone Harry Vilpat and actress Astrid Lepa.

Career

Film acting
Between 1970 and 2020, Lepa portrayed the character of Georg Aadniel Kiir in the films  Kevade (Spring) (1970), Suvi (Summer) (1976) Sügis (Autumn) (1991), and Talve (Winter) (2020), all directed by Arvo Kruusement, apart from Talve, and based on a series of novels by Oskar Luts.

Filmography

Radio acting
For many years, he performed, together with Raimo Aas, in Meelejahutaja., a Sunday morning radio programme.

References

External links

1953 births
Living people
Estonian male film actors
Estonian male radio actors
20th-century Estonian male actors
Male actors from Tallinn
People from Tallinn
Estonian journalists
Estonian Academy of Music and Theatre alumni